Heder is a river of North Rhine-Westphalia, Germany.

See also

List of rivers of North Rhine-Westphalia

References

Rivers of North Rhine-Westphalia
Rivers of Germany